Marina Wallner (born 7 November 1994) is a German former alpine ski racer.

Olympic Games results

References

External links 
 
 
 
 

1994 births
Living people
German female alpine skiers
Olympic alpine skiers of Germany
Alpine skiers at the 2018 Winter Olympics
People from Traunstein
Sportspeople from Upper Bavaria
21st-century German women